Serge Devèze (25 September 1956 – 17 December 2015) was a French association football manager, active primarily in Africa with the national teams of Guinea, Gabon and Benin. He died on 17 December 2015.

References

1956 births
2015 deaths
French football managers
French expatriate football managers
French expatriate sportspeople in Guinea
Expatriate football managers in Guinea
Guinea national football team managers
French expatriate sportspeople in Gabon
Expatriate football managers in Gabon
Gabon national football team managers
French expatriate sportspeople in Benin
Expatriate football managers in Benin
Benin national football team managers